Goor may refer to:

Places 
 Goor, a city in the province of Overijssel, Netherlands
 Heist-Goor, a village in the province of Antwerp, Belgium
 Goor (Rügen), a forest on Rügen island in Germany

People 
 Bart Goor (born 1973), Belgian former professional footballer
 Bas van de Goor (born 1971), Dutch football player
 Dan Goor (born 1975), American comedy writer and television producer
 Keren Goor (born 1998), American-born Israeli footballer
 Yvan Goor (1884–1958), Belgian cyclist and motorcyclist